Sport in Northern Ireland plays an important role in the lives of many Northern Irish people. Most sports are organised on an all-Ireland basis, for example rugby union, Gaelic games, basketball, rugby league, hockey, and cricket, whereas others, like association football and netball are organised on a separate basis for Northern Ireland.

Association football

Football is one of the most popular sports in Northern Ireland. The Irish Football Association (IFA) is the organising body for football (soccer) in Northern Ireland, and was historically the governing body for the whole of the island. The IFA sits on the International Football Association Board, which is responsible for the laws of the game.

The Northern Ireland Women's Football Association (NIWFA) is the IFA's women's football arm. It runs a Women's Cup, Women's League and the Northern Ireland women's national football team.

Many football fans in Northern Ireland prefer to support teams from England such as Manchester United and Liverpool and teams from Scotland such as Celtic and Rangers.

Domestic competitions

The domestic league is the IFA Premiership. Some of the major teams include Linfield F.C., and Glentoran F.C. Derry City FC is based in Northern Ireland but plays in the Republic of Ireland's league.

The Milk Cup is a successful international youth tournament held annually in Northern Ireland, in which clubs and national teams from anywhere in the world may compete. Northern Ireland also played host to the 2005 UEFA Under-19 European Championships.

The Setanta Sports Cup was set up by its sponsors, television channel Setanta Ireland. It is an all-island tournament, featuring twelve teams, six from the League of Ireland and six from the Irish League. Despite fairly low turn-outs for each jurisdiction's leagues, the Setanta Cup drew relatively successful gate receipts and in five editions has had one winner from Northern Ireland (Linfield in 2005).

National team

Northern Ireland's international team, despite a poor run of form in the late 1990s and first few years of the 21st century, and a corresponding slump in the FIFA World Rankings, enjoyed great success in the early and mid-1980s and recently had a revival in their fortunes under manager former Lawrie Sanchez, with home wins over Spain and England.

Most of the players come from the English or Scottish leagues although occasional appearances of Irish League players have been known.

Rugby union
Rugby union is a very popular team sport played in Ireland. The sport is organised on an all-Ireland basis with one team, governing body and league for both the Republic of Ireland and Northern Ireland.

Governing body
Irish Rugby Football Union

The Irish Rugby Football Union is the governing body for rugby union in Ireland. The IRFU is divided into four branches which represent the four provinces of Ireland: Ulster, Munster, Leinster and Connacht.

Competitions 
See also Irish rugby union system

Irish provinces compete in the United Rugby Championship, against Welsh regions, Italian cities, Scottish super-districts, and South African regions. Through performance in the URC, the four Irish provinces qualify to compete in the European Rugby Champions Cup and the EPCR Challenge Cup.

Competitions have taken place since the late 19th century with the modern day Inter-provincial Championship between Munster, Leinster, Ulster and Connacht first contested in 1920.

Another focus for the domestic game in Ireland is the All-Ireland League, which started in 1990.  For the 2022-23 season, there will be 5 divisions.

Statistics 

According to the IRB, Ireland has 201 rugby union clubs; 614 referees; 25,000 pre-teen male players; 35,000 teen male players; 14,500 senior male players (total male players 74,500) as well as 10,000 pre-teen female players; 800 teen female players; 1,200 senior female players (total female players 12,000).
							
The IRFU Annual Report for season 2006–2007 reported playing figures within Ireland as follows:
 	
Adult Male Players: 21740
Women Players: 1756	
Number of Secondary Schools Players: 23586
Number of Youth Players: 12472
Number of Mini Rugby Players: 10967
Primary School: 32209	
TOTAL PLAYERS: 100974

Current trends 

The professional era and the advent of the Celtic League and Heineken Cup has seen rugby union become a major spectator sport in Ireland. European Cup games are generally well supported in all the provinces with sell outs the norm and massive crowds in Dublin's Lansdowne Road for the Quarter and Semis which Ulster have won and Munster and Leinster have reached.  Ulster have led the Celtic League attendances for 3 years in the row and Connacht, Munster and Leinster's crowds have grown year on year.  All the provinces are planning major ground upgrades to increase capacity and comfort.

Ireland international games sell out against all but the weakest opposition, and with the team playing at Croke Park this year the attendances may reach 80,000.

The All-Ireland national team 

The Ireland national team are considered by the IRB to be in the first tier.

Ireland contest the Millennium Trophy with England as part of the Six Nations Championship.

Every four years the British and Irish Lions go on tour with players from Ireland as well as England, Scotland and Wales.

Gaelic games 
Gaelic games include Gaelic football, hurling, and  Gaelic handball.

Governing body 
Gaelic games in the North are controlled by the Ulster Provincial Board, which covers all nine counties of Ulster.

Competitions
Every footballer or hurler plays for a local club, with the best players being selected for county panels. Each county has its own county championship, with the winners going on to play in the Ulster Senior Club Football Championship or Ulster Senior Club Hurling Championship.  Crossmaglen Rangers are currently the most successful football club in the North.

The county teams play in pre-season competitions, such as the National Football League, which serves as preparation for the Ulster Senior Football Championship and All-Ireland Senior Football Championship. The hurling equivalents are the National Hurling League, Ulster Senior Hurling Championship and All-Ireland Senior Hurling Championship. In recent years, the most successful football teams from the North have been Tyrone GAA and Armagh GAA.  Hurling teams from have found it difficult to make an impact against the top counties from the South, with Antrim GAA the most successful.

County players may be selected for the Ulster provincial side to play in the Railway Cup. The team has won the Interprovincial Football Championship 32 times, but has never won the Interprovincial Hurling Championship. At international level, footballers can play for the Ireland International Rules football team against the best Australian Rules football players from Australia. Hurlers playing in the lower divisions of the All-Ireland Championship are eligible to play against the best shinty players from Scotland in composite rules shinty-hurling.

Cricket 

Cricket in Northern Ireland was a minority sport till recently, but the game has really got popular among the citizens because of the recent success stories of Irish Cricket Team, which represents both countries of Ireland. Cricket is now getting more and more popular thanks to Ireland's successful Cricket World Cup campaign in 2007 and 2011. It has been played here since the early 19th century, against Scotland (a match which has first-class status) has been played annually since 1909. The Irish team was fairly strong in the mid and late 19th century, and sent several touring parties abroad, but development of the sport was adversely affected first by the Gaelic Athletic Association's ban on its members taking part in "foreign" sports and then by the creation of the Irish Free State; many of the best cricketers in Ireland had been British soldiers and civil servants and their withdrawal led to a decline in the overall standard of the game.

There have been brighter spots in recent years, however. Dublin-born batsman Ed Joyce has played with some success as part of Ireland's ICC Trophy team and is now a key member of the Middlesex side in England's County Championship; he captained the county in 2004. Interest in Irish cricket was also generated by the national team's startling victory over West Indies in 1969; they did it again on 17 June 2004. The sport is organised on an all-island basis and is overseen by the Cricket Ireland, founded in its present incarnation in 1923. Ireland has entered some domestic English tournaments since the early 1980s, but becoming an Associate Member of the International Cricket Council in 1993 paved the way for participation in international competition, and indeed the 2005 ICC Trophy was hosted by Ireland. The Irish finished second in the tournament, beaten by Scotland. Ireland has co-hosted the Cricket World Cup in 1999. Dublin also hosted one game of the 1999 World Cup. The 2007 World Cup which was held in the West Indies was a very successful tournament for the Irish Cricket team. Having qualified for the first time for the tournament, Ireland entered the arena with much to gain. Ireland tied the match with Test Cricket playing team Zimbabwe and shocked Pakistan by defeating them on St. Patrick's Day. Suddenly there was much talk about Cricket in Ireland. Ireland qualified for the super 8 and recorded some good results, including a win against Bangladesh. Ireland have been granted ODI status and now they appear in the ODI ranking table. In June 2007 Ireland played ODI matches against India and South Africa.

Ireland went on to win the 2009 ICC World Cup Qualifier, securing their place in the 2011 Cricket World Cup and ODI status for the next four years. At the World Cup, they made history by stunning heavily favoured England in pool play with the largest successful run chase in World Cup history, led by the fastest century in World Cup history from Kevin O'Brien.

On the 22nd of June 2017, Ireland was awarded Test status following a five-year fight, becoming the eleventh team to have Test status. Ireland's first Test match was at home to Pakistan in May 2018, losing by 5 wickets after being forced to follow on. After a tour to Afghanistan, Ireland faced England in a four-day Test match at Lord's in July 2019, bowling England out for 85 before losing by 143 runs. Ireland's second innings, in which they were bowled out for 38 in 15.4 overs, was the lowest completed innings in the history of Lord's.

In November 2019, the Irish cricket team qualified for the 2020 T20 World Cup, to be held in Australia.

Motorsport 
Northern Ireland is well known as being a centre for motorcycle road racing: two international races are held in the province, the North West 200 and the Ulster Grand Prix. Road racer Joey Dunlop was voted as Northern Ireland's greatest ever sportsperson in a Belfast Telegraph poll, ahead of footballer George Best. During his career he took five consecutive Formula I World Championships, 26 Isle of Man TTs, 13 wins at the North West 200 and 24 victories at the Ulster GP, and attracted support from both the Protestant and Catholic communities. In addition, his brother Robert and nephews Michael and William have also been successful road racers, with all three taking multiple wins at the North West 200 and Ulster GP and Robert and Michael also taking several TT victories. Other notable road racers from the province include Phillip McCallen, who took 11 TT wins, including four in one week in 1996, five wins out of six races at the 1992 North West 200, five wins on one day at the 1996 Ulster GP, as well as the Macau Grand Prix, and Ryan Farquhar, another multiple winner at the TT, North West 200 and Ulster GP, who took a total of 384 wins during his career.

On the track, Jonathan Rea broke records in the World Superbike Championship in 2018, when he became the first rider to win four consecutive Superbike world titles. He also holds the records for most wins and most podiums in the championship. One of Rea's main rivals in Superbikes has been fellow Ulsterman Eugene Laverty. In Grand Prix racing, Belfast native Ralph Bryans was 50cc World Champion in 1965, becoming the only Irish rider to win a Grand Prix world title: he also took ten Grand Prix wins across his career.

On four wheels, Northern Ireland's most notable Formula One drivers are John Watson, who took five Grand Prix wins in the 1970s and 1980s and finished third in the 1982 Formula One season, and Eddie Irvine, who took four wins for Ferrari on the way to second place in the 1999 Formula One season. In touring car racing, Colin Turkington is a three time British Touring Car Champion, having won titles in 2009, 2014 and 2018, and has also been a race winner in the World Touring Car Championship. In rallying, the province's most notable names are Paddy Hopkirk, who won some of the most prestigious events in international rallying in the 1960s in his Mini Cooper S, including the Monte Carlo Rally, the Alpine Rally and the Acropolis Rally, and Kris Meeke, who has taken multiple rally wins in the World Rally Championship.

Golf
Golf is a very popular sport in Northern Ireland. Golfers from Northern Ireland enjoyed great success especially in the 2010s. Between 2010 and 2015 Graeme McDowell, Darren Clarke and Rory McIlroy won 25% of the titles in Major Championships.

Basketball 
For more international exposure, athletes from Northern Ireland have joined forces with Ireland and represent the Island of Ireland together as its own national team. The governing body of all basketball activities in the country is Basketball Northern Ireland.

Ice hockey 
The Belfast Giants have competed in the Elite Ice Hockey League since the 2000-01 season and are the sole Northern Irish team in the league. The team's roster has featured Northern Irish born players such as Mark Morrison, Graeme Walton and Gareth Roberts among others.

Geraldine Heaney, an Olympic gold medalist and one of the first women inducted into the IIHF Hall of Fame, competed internationally for Canada but was born in Northern Ireland.

Owen Nolan, (born 12 February 1972) is a Canadian former professional ice hockey player born in Northern Ireland. He was drafted 1st overall in the 1990 NHL Draft by the Quebec Nordiques.

Boxing
Boxing is a popular sport in Northern Ireland.  Prominent Northern Irish boxers include Carl Frampton, Michael Conlan, Wayne McCullough and Paddy Barnes, amongst others .

Professional wrestling 
In 2003, independent wrestlers formed Ulster Championship Wrestling (UCW). This was Northern Ireland's first wrestling promotion. Due to a number of problems, UCW folded in 2007. Also in 2007, Pro Wrestling Ulster (PWU) formed. They bought out UCW and began their own wrestling promotion. Pro Wrestling Ulster hosts IPPV's and events in Northern Ireland showcasing local, national and former WWE talent. PWU folded in 2019.

A new promotion and wrestling school Titanic Wrestling started up in April 2019. It is currently owned by local wrestler JDP. Former WWE NXT UK star Tucker Tucker takes training sessions in Titanic's school The Yard.

See also
 Sport Northern Ireland
 Sport in Ireland
 Sport in the United Kingdom

References

External links
NI Sports Council